Paracobitis vignai is a species of stone loach found in the Sistan basin in Iran.

References

Freyhof, J., H.R. Esmaeili, G. Sayyadzadeh and M. Geiger, 2014. Review of the crested loaches of the genus Paracobitis from the Iran and Iraq with the description of four new species (Teleostei: Nemacheilidae). Ichthyol. Explor. Freshwat. 25(1):11-38. 

vignai
Fish of Asia
Fish of Iran
Taxa named by Teodor T. Nalbant
Taxa named by Pier Giorgio Bianco
Fish described in 1998